Zorhan Ludovic Bassong (born May 7, 1999) is a Canadian professional soccer player who plays as a left-back for Liga I side FC Argeș Pitești and the Canadian national team.

Early life
Bassong was born in Toronto, Ontario to a Belgian Walloon mother and Cameroonian father. At three months old, he and his family moved to Montreal, where he began playing youth soccer at age five with CS Longueuil.

Club career

Cercle Brugge
Bassong joined Cercle Brugge from Lille on January 29, 2019. He was released by the Belgian club on July 8, 2020.

CF Montréal
On December 1, 2020, it was announced that Bassong had joined Canadian MLS side CF Montréal on a 2 year contract, with options for 2 additional years. After the 2022 season, his option was declined and he departed the club.

Argeș Pitești
In January 2023, Bassong signed with Romanian club Argeș Pitești.

International career
Bassong made his debut for  Canada in a 4–1 friendly win over Barbados on 10 January 2020. He was later named to the Canadian U23 provisional roster for the 2020 CONCACAF Men's Olympic Qualifying Championship on February 26, 2020. Bassong was named to the final squad ahead of the re-scheduled tournament on March 10, 2021.

Career statistics

Club

International

Honours

Club
CF Montreal
 Canadian Championship: 2021

References

External links

1999 births
Living people
Canadian soccer players
Belgian footballers
Soccer players from Toronto
Soccer players from Montreal
Canadian people of Belgian descent
Canadian people of Cameroonian descent
Sportspeople of Cameroonian descent
Black Canadian soccer players
Belgian people of Cameroonian descent
Canadian expatriate soccer players
Belgian expatriate footballers
Expatriate footballers in France
Canadian expatriate sportspeople in France
Canadian expatriate sportspeople in Romania
Belgian expatriate sportspeople in France
Royal Excel Mouscron players
R.S.C. Anderlecht players
Lille OSC players
Cercle Brugge K.S.V. players
CF Montréal players
Liga I players
FC Argeș Pitești players
Championnat National 2 players
Belgium youth international footballers
Black Belgian sportspeople
Canada men's international soccer players
Association football fullbacks
CS Longueuil players
Major League Soccer players